In Hindu temple architecture, a ratha is a facet or vertical offset projection on the plan of a structure, in particular of the shikhara above the sanctum.  The term has the same meaning when applied to the forms of the bases of statues.

A ratha is generally carried up from the bottom of the temple to the superstructure.  The corners of each ratha touch notional circles on the plan of the temple, centred on the murti or cult image inside the sanctum.  The sides are oriented along the main horizontal axis of the temple (normally running east–west) or at right angles to it, generating (except around the entrance to the sanctum) a multi-faceted plan that harmonizes the square and the circle, becoming more circular in overall shape as the number of rathas increases.

The rathas (facets) may be decorated with geometric figures or statues, such as statues of a gatekeeper watching outside or a niche with a statue of a deity. Sometimes, the facet of the ratha is hollowed to the interior; these are rathas with recesses. If there is only one facet, this is a temple with three rathas (triratha): the wall and the facet on the left and on the right.

If there are a main facet and a secondary one, the temple has five rathas (pancharatha). There are also temples with seven rathas (saptaratha) and nine rathas (navaratha).

Etymology
In Sanskrit, the word "ratha" means "cart" or "chariot", but the link with this meaning is not clear. A ratha, meaning cart, is also the temple chariot used for processing the murti at festivals, and a "ratha temple" is one designed to resemble a cart, with wheels on the sides, and often horses. The most famous example is the Sun Temple, Konarak.

Examples of triratha temples
 Parasurameswar Temple in Bhubaneswar

Examples of pancharatha temples
 Lingaraja Temple in Bhubaneswar
 Lakshmana Temple in Khajuraho
 Jagannath Temple in Puri, Orissa

Examples of saptaratha temples 
 Chaturbhuja Temple in Khajuraho
 Shiva Lakhesvara Temple near Bhubaneswar
 Shikhara of the temple of Swayambhunath in Katmandou

Examples of navaratha temples 
 Adinath Temple in Khajuraho
 Vamana temple in Khajuraho
 Shiva Purvesvara Temple near Bhubaneswar

Notes

References
Harle, J.C., The Art and Architecture of the Indian Subcontinent, 2nd edn. 1994, Yale University Press Pelican History of Art, 
Architectural elements
Hindu temple architecture
Monuments and memorials in India
Hindi words and phrases